(born July 8, 1984) is a Japanese cross-country skier. He competed at the 2006 Winter Olympics in Turin. He represented Japan at the 2010 Winter Olympics in Vancouver.

Naruse's best finish at the Winter Olympics was 13th in the team sprint at Vancouver in 2010 while his best individual finish was 35th in the 50 km event.

He finished 52nd in the 15 km event at the FIS Nordic World Ski Championships 2007 in Sapporo.

His best World Cup finish was 13th at a 4 x 10 km relay at France in 2006 while his best individual finish was 26th in a 15 km event at Estonia in 2010.

References

1984 births
Cross-country skiers at the 2006 Winter Olympics
Cross-country skiers at the 2010 Winter Olympics
Cross-country skiers at the 2014 Winter Olympics
Living people
Japanese male cross-country skiers
Olympic cross-country skiers of Japan
Cross-country skiers at the 2007 Asian Winter Games
Cross-country skiers at the 2011 Asian Winter Games
Asian Games medalists in cross-country skiing
Asian Games silver medalists for Japan
Medalists at the 2007 Asian Winter Games
Medalists at the 2011 Asian Winter Games
21st-century Japanese people